Walter Parfrey (29 April 1882 – 25 July 1918) was an Irish hurler who played in numerous positions, including goalkeeper, with the Cork senior hurling team. He was an All-Ireland Championship winner in 1902.

Career

Parfrey began his hurling career at club level with Blackrock. He played at a time when the club dominated hurling in Cork and won Cork Senior Championship titles in 1903 and 1908.

At inter-county level, Parfrey first played for the Cork senior hurling team on 20 March 1904 in what was the delayed 1902 championship. After missing Cork's Munster Championship triumph, he later won an All-Ireland Championship medal after scoring a goal in Cork's 3-13 to no score defeat of London at the Cork Athletic Grounds. Parfrey later won Munster Championship medals in 1903 and 1907. He played his last game for Cork on 25 October 1908.

Parfrey died at the age of 36 on 25 July 1918.

Honours

Blackrock
Cork Senior Hurling Championship (2): 1903, 1908, 1910

Cork
All-Ireland Senior Hurling Championship (1): 1902
Munster Senior Hurling Championship (2): 1903, 1907

References

1882 births
1918 deaths
Blackrock National Hurling Club hurlers
Cork inter-county hurlers
Hurling goalkeepers
All-Ireland Senior Hurling Championship winners